Guerilla City is the debut studio album by American rapper Guerilla Black, released on September 28, 2004 by Virgin Records. It debuted and peaked at number 20 on the US Billboard 200, selling 46,000 copies during its first week on sale, and had sold 200,000 copies as of January 2005.

Track listing

Personnel
Credits for Guerilla City adapted from AllMusic.

 Beenie Man – composer, vocals
 Ronette Bowie – A&R
 Carlos Broady – composer, producer
 Gabriele Chiesa – engineer
 Erick Coomes – bass, guitar
 Christen Delano – engineer
 Nate Dogg – composer, vocals
 Pete "Volcano" Farmer – A&R, composer, executive producer, producer
 Jason Goldstein – mixing
 Leon Gray – composer, producer
 Guerilla Black – primary artist, vocals
 Roy "Royalty" Hamilton – composer, instrumentation, producer, programming
 Kevin Haywood – engineer
 Vonda Hope-Eaton – vocals
 Jean-Marie Horvat – mixing
 Richard Huredia – mixing
 Melvin Jackson – engineer
 Tommy Jamin – engineer
 Jazze Pha – composer, producer, vocals
 Rodney "Darkchild" Jerkins – composer, producer
 Roger Karshner – composer
 Ricky Lewis – composer
 Liza Lowinger – art coordinator

 Jeremy Mackenzie – engineer
 Chuck Mangione – composer
 Jonathan Mannion – photography
 Bob Marley – composer
 Manny Marroquin – mixing
 Alan Mason – digital editing
 Fredwreck Nassar – composer, guitar, keyboards, producer
 Traci Nelson – vocals
 Marion Remazeilles – composer, vocals
 Gabriel Rene – composer, producer
 Winston Riley – composer
 Jared Robbins – digital editing
 Jimmy "Henchmen" Rosemond – executive producer
 Ric Rude – producer
 Michelle Ryang – A&R
 Sean Smith – creative director
 Alex Thomas – composer, producer, vocals
 Brooke Valentine – vocals
 Curry Weber – assistant engineer, engineer
 Charles Williamson – composer, producer
 David Wills – composer
 Mario Winans – composer, producer, vocals
 Wassim Zreik – engineer

Charts

References

2004 debut albums
Guerilla Black albums
Albums produced by Fredwreck
Albums produced by Jazze Pha
Albums produced by Rick Rock
Albums produced by Rodney Jerkins
Virgin Records albums